Nupserha hintzi is a species of beetle in the family Cerambycidae. It was described by Per Olof Christopher Aurivillius in 1923.

Varietas
 Nupserha hintzi var. nigritarsis Breuning, 1955
 Nupserha hintzi var. flavotibialis Breuning, 1958
 Nupserha hintzi var. atritarsis Breuning, 1950
 Nupserha hintzi var. tuberculatithorax Breuning, 1958

References

hintzi
Beetles described in 1923